Apo Reef is a coral reef system in the Philippines situated in the western waters of Occidental Mindoro province in the Mindoro Strait. Encompassing , it is considered the world's second-largest contiguous coral reef system, and is the largest in the country. The reef and its surrounding waters are protected areas administered as the Apo Reef Natural Park (ARNP).  It is one of the best known and most popular diving regions in the country, and is in the tentative list for UNESCO World Heritage Sites.

Geography 
It is separated from main island by the Apo east Pass of the Mindoro Strait. Politically, the reef lies within the jurisdiction of the Province of Occidental Mindoro in Region IV-B of the Philippines and more specifically of the Municipality of Sablayan. Tourism activities are administered by the local government of Sablayan and the local office of the Department of Environment and Natural Resources (DENR).

Reef system 

It is separated by two lagoon systems, the north and south lagoons which are bounded by narrow reef platforms.

The north lagoon is an enclosed triangular coral reef platform partly exposed during low tide. Likewise, reef limestone and coralline sand on the east and southeastern sides dominantly underlie the area.

Islands 
The main geographical feature of Apo Reef is submerged, but three islands mark it on the surface: the Apo Island, Apo Menor (locally known as Binangaan) and Cayos del Bajo ("Keys of the bank", locally known as Tinangkapan).  The islands are uninhabited. Since the declaration of "no-take-zone" policy at Apo Reef Natural Park in 2007, only protected area personnel and members of the Task Force MARLEN (Marine and Apo Reef Law Enforcement for Nature), who are tasked to implement protection and conservation work at the park, stay in the protected area on weekly shifts.

Apo Island 

Outside the lagoonal mangroves in the eastern and southern sides of Apo Island, the soil is sandy-to-sandy loam that has less silt and clay particles, while the lagoonal mangroves have a sandy loam to clay loam soil, underlain by decomposed plant residues or coarse materials.

Apo Island is separated from Apo Reef by a narrow, deep channel. The Apo Reef Light, situated on the northeast part of the island, warns ship about the location of this navigational hazard. The island is situated at a two and a half hour navigation 240° from Sablayan by pump boat (banka).

The island houses a permanent ranger base which monitors the national park. An administrative desk collects the environmental fees. It is possible to stay overnight in tents subject to certain conditions. Very limited facilities are available onshore to protect the island's fragile ecosystem.

Apo Menor Islet 

It is a rocky limestone island with relatively little vegetation.

Cayos del Bajo 
Cayos del Bajo are flat coralline rock formations with no vegetation on the northern lagoon near the eastern edge of the reef.  At low tide, many small rocks are dry on the reef, particularly along its north side.

Scuba diving 
The main activity of the reef relates to its underwater quality. Scuba diving and snorkeling in Apo Reef area are exceptional due to the quality of the flora, the fauna and the clarity of the water and white sand. Many species can be observed in deep or shallow waters in particular, sharks, giant napoleons, and manta rays.

Conservation history 

The Apo Reef is a protected area of the Philippines classified as a Natural park encompassing . Of the total area,  comprises the Apo Reef Natural Park while the remaining  constitute a buffer zone surrounding the protected area.

Prior to its declaration as a protected area, Apo Reef was first officially declared a "Marine Park" by then Philippine president Ferdinand Marcos in 1980. This was followed with the local government of Sablayan declaring the reef a special "Tourism Zone and Marine Reserve" three years later. In 1996, the entire reef was declared a protected natural park by then-president Fidel Ramos.

In 2006, the Protected Areas and Wildlife Bureau of the Philippine Department of Environment and Natural Resources submitted the reef to the UNESCO World Heritage Centre for consideration as a World Heritage Site.

Following a survey by the local chapter of the World Wide Fund for Nature, fishing within the reef was banned by the Philippine government in September 2007. The marine park opened for tourists to help generate funds for its protection as well as provide an alternative livelihood for hundreds of fishermen in the area. All people accessing Apo Reef need to pay an environmental fee.

Marine biodiversity

See also 
Apo Reef Light
List of protected areas of the Philippines
List of reefs
List of World Heritage Sites in the Philippines
Tubbataha Reef
Verde Island Passage

References

Bibliography 
 Department of Environment and Natural Resources, Conservation of Priority Protected Areas Project, Apo Reef Natural Park Brochure. Sablayan, Occidental Mindoro; List of Proclaimed Marine Protected Areas; Protected Areas And Wildlife Bureau, 2004.

External links 

 Apo Reef Natural Park Official Website (DENR)
 Travel Guide: Sablayan (Apo Reef/Pandan Island)

Coral reefs
Underwater diving sites in the Philippines
Reefs of the Philippines
Natural parks of the Philippines
Landforms of Occidental Mindoro
Islands of Occidental Mindoro
Tourist attractions in Occidental Mindoro
World Heritage Tentative List for the Philippines